Csaba Belényesi (born 3 March 1994) is a Hungarian football centre back who plays for NB I club Kecskemét.

Career
On 5 July 2022, Belényesi returned to Kecskemét.

Career statistics
.

References

External links
 

1994 births
Sportspeople from Debrecen
Living people
Hungarian footballers
Association football defenders
Gyulai Termál FC players
Cigánd SE players
Putnok VSE footballers
Kazincbarcikai SC footballers
Debreceni VSC players
Dorogi FC footballers
Kecskeméti TE players
Diósgyőri VTK players
Nemzeti Bajnokság I players
Nemzeti Bajnokság II players